The 2022 West Virginia Senate elections were held on November 8, 2022, and elected 17 of the chamber's 34 members. This coincided with elections in the House of Delegates, and the election of West Virginia's two representatives. Following the 2020 census, this was the first West Virginia Senate election held after redistricting. Primary elections were held on May 10, 2022.

Retirements 
Three members of the West Virginia Senate - two Democrats, and one Republican, did not run for re-election.

Democrats 

District 12: Mike Romano retired to run for Harrison County Commission.
District 13: Bob Beach retired.

Republicans 

District 14: David Sypolt retired.

Incumbents defeated

In primaries

Democrats 

 District 1: Owens Brown lost renomination to former delegate Randy Swartzmiller.

In general elections

Democrats 

 District 7: Ron Stollings lost re-election to Mike Stuart.
 District 8: Richard Lindsay lost re-election to Mark Hunt.
 District 10: Stephen Baldwin lost re-election to Vince Deeds.
 District 16: Hannah Geffert lost re-election to Jason Barrett.

Seats for Election 
In the West Virginia Senate, two members are elected from each of the 17 districts in staggered, four year terms. In the 2022 cycle, nine Republican-held seats and eight Democrat-held seats were open for election. The names of members whose seats were up for election and their winning candidates are below.

Predictions

Senate President Election 
The 2023 West Virginia Senate Presidential election will be held on January 11, 2023. 

On August 31, 2022, Republican senator and former chair of the Senate Education Committee Patricia Rucker announced that she would challenge incumbent president Craig Blair in the election. On November 22, Rucker withdrew her bid.

On December 4, 2022, Blair was renominated as President of the Senate unopposed.

At the convening of the 86th Legislature on January 11, 2023, Blair was re-elected by acclamation.

Overview 
In 2022, the Democrats, though defending fewer seats than the Republicans, had the majority of their caucus up for re-election, leaving them vulnerable to Republicans. Of the eight seats held by Democrats going into the election, all but one elected Republicans.

Appointments 
During West Virginia's 85th Legislature (2021-2022), two senators resigned from their positions. According to §3-10-5 of West Virginia Code, vacancies in the Senate are filled through appointment by the Governor of one of three candidates chosen by the executive committee of the outgoing member's party. Below is a list of appointments made during the 85th Legislature.

Close races

List of districts 
 

District 1 
Incumbent Owens Brown was appointed in 2021.

General Election

District 2 
Incumbent Charles Clements was first elected in 2016.

General Election

District 3 
Incumbent Michael Azinger was first elected in 2016.

General Election

District 4 
Incumbent Eric Tarr was first elected in 2018.

General Election

District 5 
Incumbent Mike Woelfel was first elected in 2014.

General Election

District 6 
Incumbent Mark Maynard was first elected in 2014.

General Election

District 7 
Incumbent Ron Stollings was first elected in 2006.

General Election

District 8 
Incumbent Richard Lindsay was first elected in 2018.

General Election

District 9 
Incumbent Rollan Roberts was first elected in 2018.

General Election

District 10 
Incumbent Stephen Baldwin was appointed in 2017.

General Election

District 11 
Incumbent Bill Hamilton was first elected in 2018.

General Election

District 12 
Incumbent Mike Romano was first elected in 2014. He is retiring.

General Election

District 13 
Incumbent Bob Beach was first elected in 2010. He is retiring.

General Election

District 14 
Incumbent David Sypolt was first elected in 2006. He is retiring.

General Election

District 15 
Incumbent Charles Trump was first elected in 2014.

District 16 
Incumbent Hannah Geffert was appointed in 2021. She initially did not file for re-election, but changed her mind and entered the race.

General Election

District 17 
Incumbent Tom Takubo was first elected in 2014.

General Election

References

West Virginia Senate
Senate
West Virginia Senate elections